Forest Hills station is an intermodal transfer station in Boston, Massachusetts. It serves the MBTA rapid transit Orange Line and three MBTA Commuter Rail lines (Needham, Providence/Stoughton, and Franklin/Foxboro) and is a major terminus for MBTA bus routes. It is located in Forest Hills, in the southern part of the Jamaica Plain neighborhood. Most Providence/Stoughton Line trains, and all Franklin Line and Amtrak Northeast Corridor trains, pass through the station without stopping.

The station is surrounded by large parks.  To the west of the station is Harvard University's Arnold Arboretum, part of Boston's Emerald Necklace; to the east are the Forest Hills Cemetery and Franklin Park, another part of Boston's Emerald Necklace.  The station also marks the southern end of the linear Southwest Corridor Park, built over and around the Southwest Corridor (which carries Amtrak, commuter rail, and Orange Line trains into the center of Boston).

Several small retailers are located in the station, including a doughnut/coffee shop, newspaper stand and florist.  During warmer months, a farmers' stand is set up.  In addition, the station features an MBTA Police substation. Park and ride parking spaces for 206 cars are available on the station grounds. Forest Hills station is fully accessible on all modes.

The entire Orange Line, including the Orange Line platforms at Forest Hills station, was closed from August 19 to September 18, 2022, during maintenance work. Additional commuter rail service was operated to the station during the closure.

History

Tollgate station
The Boston and Providence Railroad (B&P) was chartered on June 22, 1831, to build a rail line between its two namesake cities. Construction began in late 1832, and the B&P opened from Park Square, Boston to Canton in 1834. The remaining section of the B&P main line from Canton to Providence opened the following year with the completion of the Canton Viaduct. The B&P, like many early railroads, was primarily intended for intercity travel; the only intermediate stations north of Canton were at Dedham Plain (later called Readville) and Pierpont Village (later called Roxbury Crossing). (However, there was also an early flag stop at Tollgate where the line crossed the Norfolk and Bristol Turnpike adjacent to one of its toll gates.)

Two additional stations in Jamaica Plain were added in 1842: Jamaica Plain at Green Street, and Tollgate at the former flag stop. The B&P began regularly running Dedham Specials (which used the main line to Readville and the Dedham Branch to Dedham station) in June 1842, which made commuting from Tollgate and the other intermediate stations possible. A second track from Roxbury Crossing to Readville was added in 1845. A small station building at Tollgate was added that year, and several businesses soon sprung up around the station.

On June 3, 1850, the B&P opened a second branch to Dedham – this one from Tollgate via West Roxbury. Commuter traffic on the B&P – which had numbered just 320 daily passengers from the eight stations north of Readville in 1849 – was rapidly expanding. The railroad cut sharply into the profits of the private turnpike; it became a free public road south of Dedham in 1843, and north of Dedham in 1857. Although the station and surrounding village retained the name "Tollgate" for some time, by the 1870s they were called Forest Hills after the Forest Hills Cemetery, which was founded nearby in 1848.

Horsecars and streetcars
The railroad would soon face its own competition in the form of horsecar lines. The West Roxbury Railroad opened from South Street at McBride Street in Jamaica Plain ( north of Forest Hills station) to Roxbury Crossing in 1857. It was immediately acquired by the Metropolitan Railroad and connected to its existing trackage, providing service from Jamaica Plain to downtown Boston. After the former Turnpike (soon renamed Washington Street) became a free public road in 1857, a horsecar line was constructed on it between Tollgate and existing tracks at Dudley Square.

Most horsecar service in Boston was consolidated under the West End Street Railway in 1887. Electric streetcar service in Boston began with the Beacon Street line in 1888; the Washington Street line was electrified on September 2, 1890. The West End built its first Forest Hills Yard (renamed Arborway Yard in 1924) in 1895. The West End was acquired by the Boston Elevated Railway (BERy) in 1897. The line on South Street was extended to Forest Hills Yard in 1902; through service to the Tremont Street subway on the Arborway Line began in 1915. The Washington Street and South Street lines converged at Forest Hills Square, just east of the station; a covered platform was built there to aid transfers.

Raising the railroad
Between 1891 and 1897, the New Haven Railroad raised its main line from just south of Back Bay to Forest Hills onto a 4-track stone embankment to eliminate dangerous grade crossings.  The Forest Hills viaduct was designed by Frederick Law Olmsted as an important element of the Emerald Necklace.  Five new local stations in Dorchester and Jamaica, including Forest Hills, opened on June 1, 1897.  The station building at Forest Hills was similar to the still-extant station at Norwood Central, built two years later.

Elevated station
As with most Boston Elevated Railway stations, Forest Hills was designed for efficient streetcar-to-elevated transfers; Forest Hills and nearby Arborway became major streetcar hubs. Designed by Edmund M. Wheelwright, the station was called "the chef-d'œuvre of rapid transit development in Boston".

The New Haven Railroad briefly operated high-frequency local service from Forest Hills to South Station, but it failed to compete with the El and was cut back. The five local stops were abandoned on September 29, 1940. The Forest Hills stop alone was revived in June 1973 for Needham Line service, although by 1976 it was used by less than 50 riders a day, versus 15,000 at the Elevated station.

Southwest Corridor
From 1979 to 1987, Forest Hills was completely rebuilt as an intermodal transfer station as part of the Southwest Corridor project. The project involved removing the century-old viaduct and moving the tracks into a trench with three mainline tracks plus two Orange Line tracks to replace the aging Washington Street Elevated. The new rapid transit stations mirror the locations of the former mainline stations between Forest Hills and Back Bay. Needham Line service was suspended on October 13, 1979; Providence/Stoughton Line and Franklin Line service (which do not stop) were rerouted over the Fairmount Line on November 3, 1979. The Forest Hills viaduct was destroyed with a controlled explosion on November 12, 1983; work on the new station began on June 1, 1984.

The $38 million station, designed by Cambridge Seven Associates, was constructed of brick, steel and glass; it was meant to resemble a greenhouse to fit in with the surrounding parks. The station's $120,000 clock tower has become a local landmark; it is mirrored by four interior clocks. Orange Line service on the El ended on May 4, 1987, and began on the Southwest Corridor on May 7. The corridor reopened to commuter rail and Amtrak on October 5, 1987, though Needham Line service did not resume until October 19.

The new station included streetcar loops on the north end of the station for the relocated Arborway station, also signed as "Forest Hills", to allow closer connections than were available at Arborway. The small station included waiting shelters, maps and a turnaround loop. On December 28, 1985, the Arborway Line (Green Line E branch) service was "temporarily" suspended while construction work was performed in the Huntington Avenue subway. Service was restored to Brigham Circle on July 26, 1986 and Heath Street on November 4, 1989. However, service was never restored to Forest Hills due to the MBTA's objection to running streetcars in mixed traffic. Restoration of Green Line trolley service to Arborway was part of air pollution remediation promised for the Big Dig, but a lawsuit mandating the return of service was defeated in court in January 2011, nullifying plans to restore service.

A bicycle cage – the first MBTA "Pedal and Park" cage in Boston – opened at Forest Hills on September 28, 2009. Work performed as part of the Casey Overpass removal, which began in 2015, involved a rebuilt upper busway and a second Orange Line headhouse. The canopy was constructed as a $11 million change order to the Arborway project. The never-used Green Line loops and waiting area near the north entrance to Forest Hills were demolished. The headhouse opened on November 6, 2019. 

In August 2020, the MBTA awarded a $6.9 million design contract for additional renovations including repair or replacement of the curtain wall, replacement of the existing elevators, and a new elevator connecting the two busways. Design began in April 2021 and is expected to be completed in early 2023; construction is not yet funded.

On April 5, 2021, the final weekday outbound Providence/Stoughton Line train began stopping at Forest Hills to serve as a transfer train to the Needham Line, as the final weekday Needham-bound train originates there. The entire Orange Line was closed from August 19 to September 18, 2022. Some Providence/Stoughton Line trains stopped at the station to provide alternate service; some Franklin Line trains began stopping on September 3. Some of the additional commuter rail stopping service – eight peak Franklin Line trains and one midday train to Providence – was retained after the Orange Line closure.

Station layout

Orange Line trains use both tracks; a crossover north of the platforms allows trains to switch tracks for regular right-hand drive operation on the rest of the line. Needham Line trains primarily use Track 5 which leads directly to the branch, but may also use Track 3. Passing commuter rail trains use tracks 3, 1, and 2; Amtrak trains generally use tracks 1 and 2 because Track 3 was not originally electrified.

Bus connections 

Forest Hills serves as a major bus transfer station; 16 MBTA bus routes terminate at the station. Routes 16, 21, 31, 32, and 42 run on Hyde Park Avenue, Washington Street (north of the station), and the Arborway, and use the lower busway located off Hyde Park Avenue east of the station. The remaining nine routes run on South Street and Washington Street; they use the upper busway west of the station.

Route 39 buses formerly used loops off New Washington Street built for Green Line E branch streetcar service in the 1980s but never used as such. On October 14, 2017, it was permanently rerouted to the upper busway during removal of the Casey Overpass.

: Forest Hills station– or Harbor Point
: –Forest Hills station
: –Forest Hills station via Cummins Highway and Roslindale Square
: Mattapan station–Forest Hills station via Morton Street
: Wolcott or Cleary Square–Forest Hills station
: Dedham Square–Forest Hills station
: Walpole Center–Forest Hills station
: Dedham Mall or Stimson Street–Forest Hills station
: Millennium Park or VA Hospital–Forest Hills station
: Baker Street & Vermont Street–Forest Hills station
: Wren Street–Forest Hills station
: Forest Hills station–
: Georgetowne–Forest Hills
: Forest Hills station–
: Cleary Square–Forest Hills station
: –Forest Hills station

Route , a single early-morning trip intended for fare collectors but open to the general public, also stops at Forest Hills.

References

External links

MBTA – Forest Hills
Cambridge Seven Associates project page
 Station from Google Maps Street View

Jamaica Plain, Boston
Orange Line (MBTA) stations
Railway stations in Boston
Railway stations located underground in Boston
MBTA Commuter Rail stations in Boston
Stations on the Northeast Corridor
Railway stations in the United States opened in 1909
Railway stations in the United States opened in 1987
Stations along Old Colony Railroad lines
Stations along Boston and Providence Railroad lines
Railway stations in the United States opened in 1842
Railway stations in the United States opened in 1897
Railway stations closed in 1940
Railway stations in the United States opened in 1973
Railway stations closed in 1979